Conopeum is a genus of bryozoans belonging to the family Electridae.

The genus has cosmopolitan distribution.

Selected species:
 Conopeum aciculatum (MacGillivray, 1891) 
 Conopeum antipodum Gordon, Sutherland, Perez, Waeschenbach, Taylor & Di Martino, 2020 
 Conopeum seurati (Canu, 1928)

References

Cheilostomatida
Bryozoan genera